Meta is the fifth album by American electronic act Assemblage 23. It was released on April 24, 2007, on Metropolis Records and Accession Records. Several tracks on Meta have the signature Assemblage 23 sound while others are slightly different in approach.

Track listing
All songs written, performed and produced by Tom Shear

References

2007 albums
Assemblage 23 albums
Accession Records albums
Metropolis Records albums